Marc-André Bourdon (born September 17, 1989) is a Canadian former professional ice hockey defenceman who played in the National Hockey League (NHL). He is currently an assistant coach for the Liberty University Flames Division 1 ACHA Hockey team. He played for the Philadelphia Flyers during 2011–12 NHL season. Bourdon was selected by the Flyers in the third round (67th overall) of the 2008 NHL Entry Draft.

Playing career
Bourdon played major junior hockey in the Quebec Major Junior Hockey League where he was known as a smooth skating, offensive defenceman. Big things were expected of Bourdon when he was drafted by the Philadelphia Flyers in the third round of the 2008 NHL Entry Draft, but after his first professional season of play, Bourdon was labeled a disappointment for contributing only 19 points in 61 games with the Adirondack Phantoms during the 2009–10 AHL season. Bourdon's continuing struggles during the 2010–11 AHL season resulted in his demotion to the ECHL where he finished the season with the Greenville Road Warriors.

After beginning the 2011–12 season with the Phantoms, Bourdon and Kevin Marshall were called up to the Flyers on November 21 thanks to injuries to Chris Pronger and Braydon Coburn. Bourdon made his NHL debut that same day against the Carolina Hurricanes. Bourdon tallied his first NHL point and goal on December 13, scoring a game-winning goal against the Washington Capitals in a 5-1 Flyers win. The team was impressed with his NHL play, as scouts in the organization said that "flat out he has played better in the NHL than he ever did as a Phantom."

Bourdon signed a multi-year extension with the Flyers on August 8, 2012. No financial terms were disclosed for either deal, but CSNPhilly.com said Bourdon's pact was for two years and $1.225 million, an average annual value of $612.500. After being limited to 24 AHL games over the next two seasons due to concussions, Bourdon retired after the 2013–14 season.

Awards and honours
Canadian Major Junior Second All-Star Team (2007–08)
Emile Bouchard Trophy (2007–08)
QMJHL First All-Star Team (2007–08)

Career statistics

References

External links
 

1989 births
Adirondack Phantoms players
Canadian ice hockey defencemen
Greenville Road Warriors players
Ice hockey people from Quebec
Living people
Philadelphia Flyers draft picks
Philadelphia Flyers players
Rimouski Océanic players
Rouyn-Noranda Huskies players
Sportspeople from Saint-Hyacinthe